Padmaja  may refer to

Padmaja Naidu, Former Governor of West Bengal.
Padmaja Naidu Himalayan Zoological Park, Park located in Darjeeling.
Padmaja Phenany Joglekar, Hindustani classical singer
Padmaja Rao, an Indian actress, television director and producer

Feminine given names